781 Naval Air Squadron (781 NAS) was a Naval Air Squadron of the Royal Navy's Fleet Air Arm.

Aircraft operated
The squadron operated a variety of different aircraft and versions between 1947 & 1981:

 North American Harvard T.2b & T.3
 Hawker Sea Fury F.10, FB.11 & T.20
 Gloster Meteor T.7
 Fairey Swordfish TS.3
 de Havilland Vampire T.11/22
 de Havilland Sea Vampire T.22
 Boulton Paul Sea Balliol T.21
 de Havilland Sea Devon C.20
 Percival Sea Prince C.1, C.2 & T.1
 de Havilland Tiger Moth T.2
 Westland Whirlwind HAR.1, HAR.3, HAS.7 & HAS.22
 Hawker Sea Hawk FGA.6
 Westland Wessex HU.5
 de Havilland Sea Heron C.2
 de Havilland Heron C.4 & CC.4
 de Havilland Canada DHC-1 Chipmunk T.10

References

Citations

Bibliography

700 series Fleet Air Arm squadrons
Military units and formations established in 1940
Military units and formations of the Royal Navy in World War II